Crisis Mountain is a platform game written by David H. Schroeder for the Apple II and published by Synergistic Software in 1982. A port to the Atari 8-bit family was released in 1983. Creative Software published cartridge versions for the Commodore 64 and VIC-20. Ports for the FM-7 and PC-8800 series were from Comptiq.

In Crisis Mountain, the player must defuse bombs left in a lair below a volcano which was abandoned by terrorists. One of the first games with regenerating health, the player is not always killed by an individual mishap. Health—labeled as strength—is shown as a number from 0–3, and after taking damage it slowly increases over time. Schroeder later developed Dino Eggs for the Apple II.

Gameplay

The player runs, jumps, kneels, and crawls through the volcanic lair, attempting to reach bombs with timed detonators. Digging up a bomb disables it, a task which goes faster if the player has found the shovel. The remaining time is added to a bonus clock. After all bombs have been dealt with, the player is given the accumulated time for a "bonus run" where the goal is to collect valuable items left by the terrorists. There are two separate lairs, and the bombs and collectible items are in random locations each play.

The player starts with a strength of 3 and dies if it falls to 0. Being hit by rocks ejected from lava pits takes away 1 or 2 units, depending on the type of rock. Falling in the lava or being hit by Bertrum the radioactive bat results in immediate death. Strength slowly regenerates over time.

Development
David Schroeder was inspired to write video games after playing Donkey Kong, and Crisis Mountain started out as a minimalist version of that game in Applesoft BASIC. He chose the Apple II, because that's what was in the lab at Seattle Central Community College. He didn't own a computer until he purchased an Apple II Plus with royalties from Crisis Mountain.

Reception
Writing for Compute!, Patrick Parrish found the bat to be a key feature:
He concluded by calling it "a superior programining achievement and a thoroughly entertaining game." Softline magazine wrote, "One of the nicest things about Crisis Mountain is that no two games seem alike," and "There are enough things going on all the time that it never becomes boring."
 In an Electronic Games review, Rick Teverbaugh wrote, "Instead of looking like some uneven lines and ladders, this climbing game has a playfield that actually looks like the inside of a cave", and he called the overall visuals "superb."

References

External links
Crisis Mountain at Atari Mania

Review in Creative Computing
Review in InCider
Review in Softalk

1982 video games
Apple II games
Atari 8-bit family games
Commodore 64 games
VIC-20 games
FM-7 games
Platform games
Video games about bomb disposal
Video games about terrorism
Video games developed in the United States
Single-player video games
Creative Software games
Synergistic Software games